Christophe Ohrel (born 7 April 1968) is a Swiss former professional footballer who played as a wingback.

He was capped 56 times and scored 6 goals for the Swiss national team. He was in the Swiss squad at the 1994 FIFA World Cup, playing all four games.

Career statistics

Club

International goals
Scores and results list Switzerland's goal tally first, score column indicates score after each Ohrel goal.

References

1968 births
Living people
Footballers from Strasbourg
Swiss men's footballers
Association football defenders
Switzerland international footballers
1994 FIFA World Cup players
FC Lausanne-Sport players
Servette FC players
Stade Rennais F.C. players
AS Saint-Étienne players
FC Luzern players
Yverdon-Sport FC players
Swiss Super League players
Ligue 1 players
Swiss-French people
Swiss expatriate footballers
Swiss expatriate sportspeople in France
Expatriate footballers in France